Ian Paul (born 23 January 1961) is an English former professional footballer who played for Walsall. He later worked as Aston Villa's kit manager, succeeding his father Jim Paul in the role.

Honours
With Walsall
Football League Fourth Division runner-up: 1979–80

References

1961 births
Living people
footballers from Wolverhampton
English footballers
Association football midfielders
Walsall F.C. players
English Football League players
Aston Villa F.C. non-playing staff